Clarke Trott (date of birth unknown) is a former Bermudian cricketer. Trott's batting and bowling styles are unknown.

Trott made his debut for Bermuda in a List A match against Jamaica in the 1999/00 Red Stripe Bowl, with him making two further List A appearances in that tournament, against Guyana and the Windward Islands. He scored a total of 15 runs in his three List A matches, at an average of 5.00 and a high score of 7. With the ball he also took a single wicket.

References

External links
Clarke Trott at ESPNcricinfo
Clarke Trott at CricketArchive

Bermudian cricketers
Living people
Year of birth missing (living people)